Thomas Aloysius Clarke (May 9, 1888 – August 14, 1945), was a backup catcher in Major League Baseball  who played from 1909 through 1918 for the Chicago Cubs and Cincinnati Reds. He also served as a coach on the 1933 World Championship Giants team.

External links

1888 births
1945 deaths
Chicago Cubs players
Cincinnati Reds players
Columbia Comers players
Major League Baseball catchers
Minor league baseball managers
Montreal Royals players
New York Giants (NL) coaches
New York Giants (NL) scouts
Petersburg Goobers players
Baseball players from New York City
Burials at St. John's Cemetery (Queens)